XHAT-FM is a radio station in Ensenada, Baja California, Mexico. It broadcasts on 101.1 FM and carries a contemporary hit radio format known as Súper.

History
XHAT belonged to Grupo ACIR from August 1994 to July 2009 and was originally known as "Stereo Festival" and later "La Comadre", both with Regional Mexican music formats, before becoming "Estéreo Sol".

In 2009, Radiorama assumed operation of many of ACIR's smaller-market stations, with the station becoming known as "Sol FM" before adopting the Los 40 Principales franchised format. In 2017, all of the Grupo Audiorama stations dropped their Televisa Radio formats, including XHAT, which remained in the format with Audiorama's own Súper brand.

References

External links 
 

Radio stations in Ensenada, Baja California
Radio stations established in 1994
1994 establishments in Mexico